Bradford is a city in McKean County, Pennsylvania. Bradford is the principal city in the Bradford, PA Micropolitan Statistical Area. The population was 7,825 at the 2020 United States Census.

History
Settled in 1823, Bradford was chartered as a city in 1879 and emerged as a wild oil boomtown in the Pennsylvania oil rush in the late 19th century. The area's Pennsylvania Grade crude oil has superior qualities and is free of asphaltic constituents, contains only trace amounts of sulfur and nitrogen, and has excellent characteristics for refining into lubricants. The Bradford & Foster Brook Railway was built in 1876 as one of, if not the first, monorails in America, when Bradford was a booming oil town. World-famous Kendall racing oils were produced in Bradford.

Bradford was the site of an important step in the development of personal aviation. In the 1930s, the Taylor Brothers Aircraft Corporation produced an airplane called the Taylor Cub in Bradford. After a fire at the factory, the company was bought by William T. Piper. After relocating his factory to Lock Haven, Pennsylvania, Piper resumed production of a revised design of the airplane first produced in Bradford, which became the world-famous Piper Cub.

The population peaked at 19,306 in 1930, but at the 2010 census had dropped to 8,770. Two adjoining townships, home to approximately 9,000 people, make the population of Greater Bradford about 18,000. Famous Bradfordians include the opera singer Marilyn Horne, the Hall of Fame baseball player Rube Waddell and the five-time All-Star football player Stew Barber. A famous perpetual motion machine hoax was created in Bradford in 1897 by J.M. Aldrich. The hoax was exposed in the July 1, 1899, issue of the Scientific American magazine. Ultimately, Aldrich was sentenced to four months in the county jail.

The Bradford Armory, Bradford Downtown Historic District, Bradford Old City Hall, and Rufus Barrett Stone House are listed on the National Register of Historic Places.

Economy 

Bradford is the home of Zippo (est. 1932), a manufacturer of collectible pocket lighters, and Case (est. in Bradford in 1905), which is owned by Zippo and makes hunting, fishing, folding pocketknives, and collectibles. In February 2009, the two companies employed 1,117 people, but significant layoffs have taken place since. After Zippo and Case, the second largest employer is Bradford Regional Medical Center (BRMC), which employed 759 in February 2009. BRMC underwent a significant campus expansion in 2006. Other major employers in February 2009 included Beacon Light (682 employees), which is responsible for overseeing troubled youth. Bradford Area School District (474) and Wal-Mart (378). FCI McKean nearby employed 301 at that time.

The city is home to American Refining Group (formerly Kendall), and their line of specialty products. Along with being Bradford's longest running active business, ARG is the oldest continuously operating refinery in the United States. It celebrated its 125th anniversary in 2006. Since ARG purchased the refinery in the mid-1990s, employment has almost doubled to just under 300 in February 2009.

Bradford has a four-year college, the University of Pittsburgh at Bradford (Pitt-Bradford), which in the fall term 2009 had 1,455 full-time students and 202 part-time students for a total enrollment of 1,657, with 217 full-time employees and 106 part-time employees. Almost 900 students live on campus.

The city's shopping mall and many of its chain businesses are located just north of the city line in Foster Brook.

Arts and entertainment
The Bradford Creative and Performing Arts Center season runs from September to March. The Bromeley Family Theater at The University of Pittsburgh at Bradford hosts many events in the university's Spectrum Series that brings authors, artists, musicians, recitalists and performance groups to campus with all events open to the public. Theater productions are staged by the theater departments at Pitt-Bradford and the high school and by the Bradford Little Theater (BLT), which celebrated its 10th anniversary in 2006. BLT also operates Togi's Playhouse for smaller productions. An annual community talent show, Kiwanis Kapers, occurs in the fall.

In May 2017, the Marilyn Horne Museum and Exhibit Center opened in downtown Bradford. Part of the University of Pittsburgh at Bradford, the 3,400 square-foot exhibition space celebrates the life and career of American mezzo-soprano, Marilyn Horne. The museum highlights objects from Horne's personal archive, which is housed at the University of Pittsburgh.

Annual festivals include Stinkfest (a festival promoting leek cuisine), Summer Daze (formerly known as Summerfest), Autumn Daze, the Italian Festival, the Zippo/Case International Swap Meet (biennial, with Zippo Days held in off years) and the Crook Farm Country Fair. In early August, the annual Big 30 Charity high school all star football game takes place at Parkway Field, where a million-dollar artificial playing surface was installed in 2008. In 2009, for the first time, National Night Out was a significant event in Bradford, coinciding with Taste of Bradford. A First Night celebration is held on New Year's Eve, complete with a ball drop of its own.

Demographics

As of the census of 2000, there were 9,175 people, 3,922 households, and 2,247 families residing in the city. The population density was 2,659.7 people per square mile (1,026.8/km2). There were 4,371 housing units at an average density of 1,267.1 per square mile (489.2/km2). The racial makeup of the city was 97.74% White, 0.49% African American, 0.31% Native American, 0.52% Asian, 0.03% Pacific Islander, 0.27% from other races, and 0.63% from two or more races. Hispanic or Latino of any race were 0.95% of the population.

There are 3,922 households, out of which 29.4% had children under the age of 18, 36.9% were married couples living together, 14.8% had a female householder with no husband present, and 42.7% of households were non-families. 36.3% of all households were made up of individuals, and 15.2% had someone living alone who was 65 years of age or older. The average household size was 2.27 and the average family size was 2.93.

In the city, the population was spread out, with 25.4% under the age of 18, 9.4% from 18 to 24, 28.0% from 25 to 44, 20.0% from 45 to 64, and 17.1% who were 65 years of age or older. The median age was 36 years. For every 100 females, there were 88.4 males. For every 100 females age 18 and over, there were 83.7 males.

The median income for a household in the city was $26,463, and the median income for a family was $32,828. Males had a median income of $30,661 versus $21,250 for females. The per capita income for the city was $17,537. About 16.9% of families and 20.7% of the population was below the poverty line, including 28.1% of those under age 18 and 9.5% of those age 65 or over.

Geography
Bradford is located on U.S. Route 219, just south of its junction with Interstate 86 north of the New York border. Bradford is situated in a valley in the Allegheny Mountains and is surrounded by woods and steep hills. Two branches of the Tunungwant Creek enter the city, merge and flow north into the Allegheny River just across the New York border.

Because of the higher elevation, the airport often has the coldest reported air temperatures in Pennsylvania. The airport has one of the few National Weather Service stations across the entire northern tier of the state. Temperatures in the city are typically three to seven degrees warmer than at the airport due to the difference in elevation, and actual city temperatures are more representative of other communities in northern Pennsylvania and southwestern New York than are the airport's.

Climate
Bradford has a humid continental climate (Dfb) with cold, long, snowy winters and warm, humid summers. Other notable extremes include a  recording on November 29, 1930, and on November 30, 1929, a  recording on April 1, 1923, an  degree reading on March 30, 1986, and March 29, 1998, and a  degree reading on August 29, 1982. Late fall/early winter is especially snowy due to heavy amounts of lake effect snow from Lake Erie and, to a lesser extent, Lake Ontario. Lake effect snow during cold snaps in early spring also helps to raise snowfall totals.

Recreation
Bradford is located within miles of the Allegany State Park in New York, the third-largest state park in the United States, and the Allegheny National Forest, the only national forest in Pennsylvania.

The Tuna Valley Trails Association has constructed several miles of trails in the community, with a master plan of over  currently being planned, funded and implemented.

Parks in the city include Callahan Park, with swimming pools, tennis courts and an enclosed ice skating rink, and Hanley Park, with a large playground, horseshoe pits and a skate park.

The surrounding area has two golf courses, the Pennhills Club in Bradford Township and Pine Acres Golf Course near Marshburg.

Notable people
 Marjorie West, a child of 4 who disappeared in 1938
 Stew Barber, collegiate and professional football player; born in Bradford on June 14, 1939
 Inez Barbour Hadley, soprano singer, born in Bradford in 1879
 George Grant Blaisdell, founder of the Zippo lighter company; born in Bradford on June 5, 1895
 John Gilmore, opera singer
 Marilyn Horne, American mezzo-soprano opera singer; born in Bradford on January 16, 1934
 Henry Clinton Hunt, Wisconsin State Assemblyman; born in Bradford on January 27, 1840
 Larry Peace, NFL player
J. Howard Pew, president of Sun Oil Company (Sonoco) for 35 years and noted philanthropist; born in Bradford in 1882
 Todd Schlopy, feature film cameraman, briefly an NFL player
 Rube Waddell, Baseball Hall of Fame pitcher; born in Bradford on October 13, 1876
 Jay and Jules Allen, film exhibitors
 Philip M. Shannon, Mayor of Bradford, oil businessman, and millionaire; born in Bradford on September 2, 1846
 A. Leo Weil, lawyer

Notes

References

External links

 City website
 Chamber of commerce
 Bradford Era newspaper
 Bradford Regional Medical Center

Populated places established in 1823
Cities in McKean County, Pennsylvania
1823 establishments in Pennsylvania
Cities in Pennsylvania